XebiaLabs is an independent software company specializing in DevOps and continuous delivery for large enterprise organizations. The offers a DevOps Platform, for application-release automation (ARO). These components include release orchestration, deployment automation, and DevOps intelligence.

The company is headquartered in the US in Burlington, Massachusetts, with additional offices in the Netherlands, UK, France, Germany, India, and Spain.

History
Founded in 2008, XebiaLabs was originally backed by Xebia Group, a digital software and services company based in the Netherlands. In 2014, XebiaLabs received funding from its first institutional investor, Updata Partners. 

In 2017, XebiaLabs posted 130% revenue growth, and the company added new customers, such as Amgen, AXA, Bosch and Bpifrance. The company also added offices in Germany and Spain and increased global staff by 40%. 

In February 2018, the company announced that it secured a Series B growth investment of over $100 million from investors, led by Susquehanna Growth Equity and Accel. As part of the investment, Martin Angert, director at Susquehanna Growth Equity, and Arun Mathew, partner at Accel, joined the XebiaLabs Board of Directors.

In 2019, XebiaLabs merged with CollabNet VersionOne, a company under private equity firm TPG Capital. 2020 brought Arxan Technologies into the mix and the three companies formed Digital.ai.

Key partnerships 
XebiaLabs is an Advanced Technology Partner in the AWS Partner Network (APN).

The company is also a CapGemini DevOps Strategic Partner.

In October 2019, XebiaLabs announced that Wipro Limited, (NYSE: WIT, BSE: 507685, NSE: WIPRO), a leading global information technology, consulting, and business process services company, renewed and extended its partnership with XebiaLabs as their Strategic Enterprise DevOps Partner across the globe.

In 2017, XebiaLabs was named a leader in the Gartner 2017 Magic Quadrant for Application Release Automation (ARA) for the second year in a row. And in their 2017 "Gartner Critical Capabilities for Application Release Automation" report, Gartner scored XebiaLabs highest in three out of four use cases.

In 2018, XebiaLabs was again placed in the Leaders quadrant by Gartner in their Magic Quadrant for Application Release Orchestration report (formerly called the "Magic Quadrant for Application Release Automation").

In 2019, XebiaLabs was placed in the Leaders quadrant by Gartner in their Magic Quadrant for Application Release Orchestration report for the fourth consecutive year. Gartner also recognized XebiaLabs in the 2019 "Gartner Critical Capabilities for Application Release Automation" report, where the company received a score of 4.89 out of 5 in the release manager use case and a score of 4.84 out of 5 in the application/product owner use case.

In "The Forrester Wave: Continuous Delivery and Release Automation, Q3 2017" report, Forrester Research named XebiaLabs a leader and gave it the highest score in the Current Offering category. In the prior year, Forrester ranked XebiaLabs highest in the category of strategy and named it a 'Strong Performer' in "The Forrester Wave: Application Release Automation, Q3 2016," report.

In August 2018, XebiaLabs was recognized as a Strong Performer and received a differentiated rating in the criteria of analytics, integration, vision, and market approach in "The Forrester New Wave: Value Stream Management Tools, Q3."

XebiaLabs is also known in the DevOps community for its "Periodic Table of DevOps Tools," a DevOps landscape tool that allows users to see many of the tools used in DevOps toolchains. The company announced version 3 of The Periodic Table of DevOps Tools in June 2018, adding 52 new DevOps tools, a new design, and the addition of categories, such as Analytics and AIOps.

In June 2017, the company was chosen as a winner of the 2017 SD Times 100: 'Best in Show' Awards for Software Development in the DevOps category.

In April 2018, XebiaLabs was selected as an honoree as part of the Boston Business Journal's Best Places to Work awards.

In 2019, XebiaLabs announced it had hired Dave Reuter, Sr. as Enterprise, Business Development Representative II (Federal & Retail) to help create business value through Digital Transformation & Reliability engineering.

In 2020, Arxan, CollabNet VersionOne , and XebiaLabs joined to form Digital.ai.

See also

Application-release automation
Continuous integration
Continuous delivery
DevOps
DevOps toolchain
BuildMaster
Software build automation

References

External links

Companies based in Burlington, Massachusetts
Defunct software companies of the United States
Information technology companies of the United States
Software companies established in 2008
American companies established in 2008
2008 establishments in Massachusetts